Ozan Marsh (June 25, 1920 in Pasadena, California – March 15, 1992) was a pianist active in concert performances throughout the world as well as across the United States.

A disciple of Rachmaninoff, Horowitz, Petri, Casadesus and von Sauer, the late Ozan Marsh has received the plaudits of audiences and critics around the world, particularly for his performances of Liszt and Chopin. He was also noted for his performances of the piano works of Kabalevsky.

During his career, Marsh won critical acclaim in recital appearances and as soloist with many of the world’s most distinguished orchestras: among them, the New York Philharmonic, Philadelphia Orchestra, Boston Pops, Boston Symphony, San Francisco Symphony, Vienna Philharmonic, Warsaw Philharmonic, St. Petersburg Philharmonic, Moscow Philharmonic Orchestra, the Royal Philharmonic, London Symphony Orchestra and the London Philharmonic Orchestras, to name a few.

Before the second world war he studied in Europe at Fontainebleau  with Robert and Gaby Casadesus, Isidore Phillipp and other noted figures of this musical period. He traveled to Vienna and worked with Emil von Sauer (one of the last surviving pupils of Franz Liszt) and continued study with Egon Petri during summer sessions in Zakopane, Poland. Marsh gave his Paris and Warsaw debut (Warsaw Conservatory) in 1938 only months before the outbreak of the war. His first Town Hall New York debut was in 1939 and received fine praise from the New York Times. During WWII he served in the Navy's "Lighter than Air" dirigible squadron as well as a final post as chaplains assistant because of a disability caused by the war.

During his career he played over 200 concert appearances with the Boston Pops Orchestra (in Boston and on nationwide concert tours), Appeared a number of times with the New York Philharmonic and Baltimore Symphony Orchestra as well as gave hundreds of solo concerts throughout the United States under Columbia Artists Management, on their Community Concerts Series. During his life he had the opportunity to tour Russia (former Soviet Union 1980)at the invitation of the Soviet Government and at the invitation of one of that nations foremost senior composers Dimitri Kabalevsky. He toured South Korea three time and China PRC twice playing solo concerts as well as appearing with orchestra with the Beijing (China) Opera Orchestra.

Ozan Marsh coupled an outstanding performing career with an equally distinguished academic one. He served on the faculties of such major institutions as Indiana University, Manhattan School of Music, Butler University, St. Lawrence University, University of Arizona and the Chautauqua Institution. He participated in judging various international piano competitions including the Van Cliburn, the Franz Liszt, the National Federation of Music Clubs and many others. Some of his students include Donna Amato, Dr. Janet (Adolphson) Colburn, Edgar Coleman, and David Syme among others.  He was also the President of the Pianist's Foundation of America, (formerly the Southwest Pianists Foundation) an organization devoted to furthering of the careers of promising young pianists. He gave a great deal of his time to the much needed project of furthering the goals of those pianists, many who have gone on to wonderful careers themselves.
  
Ozan Marsh has recorded for RCA (His Masters Voice), CBS (Columbia), PFA and VLR Records, the Voice of America and the Boston Symphony Transcription Library.

Discography
His discography includes:
Hungarian Fantasy for Piano and Orchestra RCA (His Masters Voice)Victrola, Arthur Fiedler and the Boston Pops Orchestra 1959
Re-Released several times on RCA "Everything but the Beer","Three Concert Gems" CD and others.
Dmitri Kabalevsky Concerto #2 for Piano and Orchestra, Royal Philharmonic of London, CSP Columbia Records,Collectors Edition
Dmitri Kabalevsky Preludes and Rondo, CSP Columbia Records, Collectors Edition
Liszt Piano Concerto #1 in Eflat, Spanish Rapsody (Busoni), Totentanz (Solo Piano) London Philharmonic Orchestra, Released on VOX Cum Laude, Allegro Records and Concert Artists Records (UK)
Other Recordings VLR:
Liszt B Minor Sonata, 12 Hungarian Rhapsody
"A Century of Treasure" All Liszt Recording
(SPF Records) Chopin 2nd Piano Sonata and Mazurkas

Live recordings
Rachmaninoff Concerto #1 (1960)
Rachmaninoff Concerto #2 (Un-Released)
Kabalevsky Concerto #2 (1960)
Liszt B Minor Sonata (1983)
Rachmaninoff 2nd Sonata (1983)
Scriabin 7th Sonata (1983)
Kabalevsky Piano Concerto #2 Moscow Symphony (1980)

References

American classical pianists
American male pianists
1920 births
1992 deaths
Manhattan School of Music faculty
Indiana University faculty
Butler University faculty
University of Arizona faculty
20th-century classical pianists
20th-century American pianists
20th-century American male musicians